Star Wars Episode I: Obi-Wan's Adventures is a video game that chronicles the events of the film Star Wars: Episode I – The Phantom Menace from the character Obi-Wan Kenobi's perspective. It is the result of an agreement made in 2000 between the two video game publishers LucasArts and THQ. The agreement allows THQ to turn LucasArts licenses into games for the hand held console Game Boy Color, the first being Obi-Wan's Adventures. THQ published the game and HotGen developed it. It was released on December 6, 2000.

The story of Obi-Wan's Adventures is set in the middle of a conflict in the Galactic Republic; the antagonistic Trade Federation and the evil Sith Lord are planning to take control of the galaxy. In the game, the player operates the character Obi-Wan Kenobi as he fights the forces of the Trade Federation which culminates in a battle against Darth Maul. His weapons include a lightsaber, a blaster, and use of the Force . Since its release, Obi-Wan's Adventures has received mixed reviews. The game has been criticized for its visuals and controls, but praised for its sound design and creative levels.

Gameplay
Obi-Wan's Adventures is an isometric action-adventure video game with side-scrolling sections. Set in the fictional Star Wars galaxy, the game takes place in a time when the fictional Galactic Republic is in imbalance as a result of the antagonistic Trade Federation and the evil Sith Lord's plans to take over. In the game, the player controls the Star Wars character Obi-Wan Kenobi, a young Jedi apprentice, during the events of the film Star Wars Episode I: The Phantom Menace.

There are a total of nine levels in Obi-Wan's Adventures that can be played with different difficult-settings. Obi-Wan is attacked by the Trade Federation's droids, bounty hunters, and other evil critters during his travels, and the player is able to control his lightsaber and blaster to defeat them. Both close- and long-range combat are available in the battles with the Federation's forces. The player can also take advantage of Obi-Wan's connection to the Force as a weapon. In order to do this, the player hits the "A" key to zoom in on the target and then hits "A" again to blow the enemy away. The power of the Force is limited and eventually runs out. To power up, the player accumulates Force pellets that can be obtained on the different levels. The Force is not only used as weapon, but also to get through the levels by moving objects that are in the way.

Plot

The game begins with the Trade Federation's blockade of the planet Naboo. Jedi Master Qui-Gon Jinn and his apprentice Obi-Wan are assigned by the Jedi Council as part of a mission to officiate the dispute and reach a settlement with the Federation leaders. When they reach the Federation's ship on Naboo, however, they find out that the Federation is not interested in negotiations and is secretly allied with the leader of the Sith, the Jedi Order's enemies; together, they plan to invade Naboo and take control of the galaxy by killing all Jedi. Obi-Wan and Qui-Gon are attacked by Federation droids, but manage to escape. They head to Theed, the capital of Naboo, to warn the unprepared inhabitants about the imminent attack.

During their journey to the city, the two Jedi cross Naboo's swamps and are assaulted by invading troops sent by the Federation. After delivering the warning, they travel to the planet Coruscant to talk with the Jedi Council. They are attacked by more Federation troops after arriving, but the two Jedi are able to defeat them. Jedi Grandmaster Yoda instructs Obi-Wan and Qui-Gon to return to Naboo and help Queen Amidala and her people defeat the Federation. Upon reaching Theed, the Jedi set out to liberate the city. To get around the Federation's droids, they manage to infiltrate the city by going through a secret entrance to the ancient catacombs, but are discovered and forced to battle the droids on their way through.

Obi-Wan and Qui-Gon discover that Amidala has been captured by the Federation and will soon have to sign a treaty handing control to them. Before heading to the Queen's palace to initiate an attack, they free captured citizens on the streets of Theed. The Jedi infiltrate the palace and manage to free the Queen, ruining the Federation's plans. Obi-Wan and Qui-Gon then encounter the Sith apprentice Darth Maul. Qui-Gon is mortally wounded in the battle, but Obi-Wan manages to kill Maul in retaliation. As a result, Obi-Wan's quest to become a Jedi Knight is completed.

Development
In 2000, the two video game publishers LucasArts and THQ announced an agreement that would allow THQ to turn LucasArts licenses into games for the hand held console Game Boy Color. THQ had previously published the Game Boy Color game Star Wars: Yoda Stories, and began work on their second Star Wars-licensed product, Obi-Wan's Adventures, thereafter as part of the agreement with LucasArts. It was a port of the then upcoming game Star Wars: Obi-Wan, which was planned to be released for personal computers (PC) but was later canceled. Obi-Wan's Adventures was first announced to the public in September 2000.

THQ hired the third-party Game Boy developer HotGen to develop the game, which they described as "the most authentic Star Wars adventure on the Game Boy Color system." Mark Fisher, director of product development at HotGen, commented on the game: "THQ has a solid hold on the Game Boy Color market, and we look forward to collaborating with them on Star Wars: Obi-Wan's Adventures. Millions of Star Wars fans will have the opportunity to interact with their favorite characters in a brand new Star Wars adventure just in time for the holidays." Obi-Wan's Adventures was released in stores on December 6, 2000.

Reception

The game has received mixed reviews from critics, with an aggregate score of 62.33% on GameRankings. Marc Nix of IGN gave it a 5/10 rating and commented that "murky visuals and slothful control destroy any hope of greatness in this game." The visuals were also criticized by an editor of 1UP.com, who stated that "you couldn't even see what the hell you were doing half the time in the game." Matt Paddock of Game Vortex commented that Obi Wan's Adventures "will be a must-buy for Star Wars freaks (and there's more than a few), but flawed control and lack of depth make for a generally average experience."

Kevin Cheung of The Sydney Morning Herald said the game "loses out badly in the graphics department", commenting that on the "tiny LCD screen the characters look like a garbled confusion of black pixels. It takes a healthy imagination to see the lasers bouncing off one's lightsabre. What's worse is that it's not always obvious where the exit passage is, which is frustrating after a slog through a tough level." In addition, Tim Wapshott of The Times said that "despite some rather good storyline screens, the graphics generally lack colour and the music is repetitive and tedious."

Nix praised the game's sound design, describing it as "far and away above what would be expected on the Game Boy Color." He noted, for example, that "there are individual sounds of the lightsaber swinging back and forth — cutting left will sound differently than the backswing or upswing of the third stroke against an enemy." Samantha Craggs of The Electric Playground praised Obi-Wan's Adventures for its interesting gameplay and the use of the lightsaber. She commented: "There are quite a few things to like about this game. For one thing, you can't underestimate the feeling of moving across the floor wielding a deadly lightsaber. Also, the levels are interesting. [...] In [one level], Obi-Wan is actually in a boat, going through the Naboo swamp, while battle droids shoot at him from the banks. While you're essentially fighting the same enemies in the same manner, there are enough twists in the level designs to interest you in continuing."

References

External links

2000 video games
Action-adventure games
Game Boy Color games
Game Boy Color-only games
Side-scrolling video games
Star Wars: Episode I – The Phantom Menace video games
LucasArts games
THQ games
Video games developed in the United Kingdom
Video games with isometric graphics
HotGen games